Leo Bianchi (born 9 March 1974) is an Italian-born Bulgarian singer-songwriter, chef and TV personality. He has released a number of singles at times using the mononym Лео (or Leo) and cooperated with a number of artists, notably Deo, Ingrata amongst many. He took part in the Bulgarian TV reality show Big Brother 2 in 2005 and in Big Brother All Stars 2013, in both of which he finished as runner-up.  He also had some cooking shows.
In 2018 he participates as a jury of Master Chef Bulgaria and In 2019 he works with BTV (national television) with his program "life is beautiful" and at the same time his first autobiographical book "La mia strada" is published

Biography
Bianchi was born in Ancona, Italy. At age of 15, he stopped going to school and started searching for a job. Then he found the profession of cooking to be his passion. He first visited Bulgaria in 1992. Since 1994 he settled in the Bulgarian city of Burgas. In 2005, he participated in Big Brother 2 Bulgaria. He is the first foreigner to be in Big Brother Bulgaria. He stayed in the show till the final, but finished on second position. The show helped him a lot in real life. He became a chef in a Bulgarian cooking show on TV 7. Soon, he met Deo, a Bulgarian singer and rapper, and they sang some duets. He also performed duets with Maria Ilieva. Now he made some musical projects with Deo, Igrata and Raffi,JJ,Gergana Nikolaeva,Joanna Dragneva,Moisey,Skandau group,Dicho,Linda D.

Bianchi owns two Italian pizza restaurants and an Italian style coffee shop in the Bulgarian capital Sofia, where he now lives. In 2013 Leo participated again in Big Brother All Stars 2013 where he finished second again.

Personal life
Leo lives in Sofia, Bulgaria with his wife Lucia. They have been engaged since 2004. In 2013, 2 weeks before he entered Big Brother All Stars, they had twins, Mattia and Niccolò, born in Sofia, Bulgaria.

Discography

Songs and videos
 "Пази маса" (with Deo) (2006)
 "Е, и?" (with Deo) (2007)
 "Give Me Your Hand" (feat. Nikita) (2007)
 "Ако искаш да те забележат (with Igrata and Krisko) (2010)
 "Айде на морето" (with Igrata) (2012)
 "Weekend" (with Igrata) (2012)
 "Яко парти" (2012)
 "100 неща" (with Yoanna) (2013)
 "Целият свят" (with Deo) (2013)
 "Цяло лято" (with Igrata and Krisko) (2013)
 "4D" (with Igrata, Deo and Raffi) (2013) 
 "Да, да, да" (with Igrata and Bate Pesho) (2013)
 "Дай газ" (with Deo) (2013)
 "За Вас" (2014)
 "Всеки миг" (with Deo, Igrata, Din-Yo and Marina) (2014)
 "Цяла нощ" (with JJ) (2014)
 "Ей така" (with Igrata and Starlight) (2014)
 "Mr. Comandante" (with Igrata, Deo and Raffi) (2014)
 "Безгрижно"(with Deo) (2015)
 "№1" (with Igrata and Deo) (2015)
 "Имам си мечта" (with Igrata and Deo feat. Lexus) (2015)
 "Priatel" (2015)
 "Lettera d'amico" (Stritti feat Leo) (2015)
 "Se Torno" (2016)
 "Сега сме други" (with Igrata and Skandau) (2016)
 "Така ми е добре" (with Igrata and Дичо) (2017)
 "Карамбол" (with Igrata and Skandau,Део,Дичо,Девора) (2017)
 "Luce" (2020)
 "FAKE" (2021)
 "TRUE LOVE" (Stritti feat Leo (2022)

External links
 Big Brother All Stars profile 
 Master Chef Bulgaria
 Official Facebook page
 Official instagram page
 Say It in a Plate | TEDxVitosha

References

1974 births
Living people
People from Ancona
Bulgarian pop singers
Big Brother (Bulgarian TV series) contestants
Italian expatriates in Bulgaria